Anna Maria Hinel, (born 31 January 1924 in Warsaw, died on March 19, 1943, in Auschwitz-Birkenau), was a Polish girl scout, activist of the underground independence movement during World War II, author of a diary from the German Nazi occupation.

Early life 
Anna Maria Hinel was born on January 31, 1924, in Warsaw, in Poland. She was the only child of Jadwiga and Wawrzyniec Hinel. Anna Maria Hinel was a student at the Queen Jadwiga Junior High School in Warsaw, in Poland. She graduated from the third grade until the outbreak of the World War II. During the war, she continued her education as part of secret teaching in German-occupied Poland by teachers from her former school. Together with her teachers and schoolmates, she was active in the Department of Conspiracy Communications Union of Armed Struggle - Home Army (ZWZ-AK).

Arrest 
As a result of a German Nazi investigation, she was arrested along with her friends and two teachers. On the night of April 28–29, 1942, she was arrested, in her apartment at Florianska Street, in Warsaw.

Deportation and death 

She was arrested and imprisoned in German Nazi Pawiak prison in the women's ward called "Serbia Prison in Warsaw". She was investigated at the Gestapo headquarters in Aleja Szucha in Warsaw. For several months, the whole group was subjected to brutal interrogations. Anna Maria Hinel did not say anything to the occupiers, she did not betray anyone, just like her friends. Her both teachers were killed in the Pawiak prison. On November 13, 1942, she was deported with her friends to the German Nazi concentration camp Auschwitz-Birkenau. Anna Maria Hinel received the number 24447 in Auschwitz camp. She wrote her last letter to her parents from block 23 of the Auschwitz-Birkenau camp. She died on March 19, 1943, in Auschwitz concentration camp. She was 19 years old at the time

The Diary of Anna Maria Hinel 
The father of Anna Maria Hinel, many years after the death of his daughter, found under the floor in an apartment on Florianska Street - her diary written from September 30, 1939, to August 5, 1940. From March 2013, the "Diary of Anna Maria Hinel" is in the collections of the Auschwitz-Birkenau State Museum

In culture 
Stanisław Majewski, based on the diary of Anna Maria Hinel, wrote a book titled "Anna Maria". Published in it are reproduced and read diary cards. Based on the "Diary of Anna Maria Hinel", director Ludmiła Niedbalska made a film in 1981 entitled "Schoolgirl". The film starred among others: Ewa Serwa, Barbara Rachwalska, Teresa Lipowska, Jerzy Kryszak, Tomasz Zaliwski, Jacek Borkowski, Wieńczysław Gliński, Jacek Kałucki and Tomasz Stockinger

Commemoration 
In the building where Anna Maria Hinel lived and was arrested and where her diary was found at Floriańska Street number 8, in Warsaw, there is a plaque dedicated to her.

See also 

 Anne Frank
 Rutka Laskier
 List of diarists
 List of Poles
 Nazi crimes against the Polish nation
 Wola massacre
 List of Poles
 Wawer massacre

References

External links 

 
 
 , Number 13., December 2009. pp. 8–10.

Bibliography

Anna Maria Hinel 

1943 deaths
20th-century Polish non-fiction writers
Child writers
Polish civilians killed in World War II
Historians of fascism
Polish Scouts and Guides
Women diarists
Women in World War II
1924 births
20th-century Polish women writers
Auschwitz concentration camp prisoners
Polish children
Polish diarists
Polish people who died in Auschwitz concentration camp
Polish murder victims
Writers from Warsaw
20th-century diarists